David Harold Bailey (born 1948) is a mathematician and computer scientist. He received his B.S. in mathematics from Brigham Young University in 1972 and his Ph.D. in mathematics from Stanford University in 1976. He worked for 14 years as a computer scientist at NASA Ames Research Center, and then from 1998 to 2013 as a Senior Scientist at the Lawrence Berkeley National Laboratory. He is now retired from the Berkeley Lab.

Bailey is perhaps best known as a co-author (with Peter Borwein and Simon Plouffe) of a 1997 paper that presented a new formula for π (pi), which had been discovered by Plouffe in 1995.  This Bailey–Borwein–Plouffe formula permits one to calculate binary or hexadecimal digits of pi beginning at an arbitrary position, by means of a simple algorithm. Subsequently, Bailey and Richard Crandall showed that the existence of this and similar formulas has implications for the long-standing question of "normality"—whether and why the digits of certain mathematical constants (including pi) appear "random" in a particular sense.

Bailey is a long-time collaborator with the late Jonathan Borwein (Peter's brother). They co-authored five books and over 80 technical papers on experimental mathematics.

Bailey also does research in numerical analysis and parallel computing. He has published studies on the fast Fourier transform, high-precision arithmetic, and the PSLQ algorithm (used for integer relation detection). He is a co-author of the NAS Benchmarks, which are used to assess and analyze the performance of parallel scientific computers.

He has also published articles in the area of mathematical finance, including a 2014 paper "Pseudo-mathematics and financial charlatanism," which emphasizes the dangers of statistical overfitting and other abuses of mathematics in the financial field.

In 1993, Bailey received the Sidney Fernbach award from the IEEE Computer Society, as well as the Chauvenet Prize and the Hasse Prize from the Mathematical Association of America. In 2008 he was a co-recipient of the Gordon Bell Prize from the Association for Computing Machinery. In 2017 he was a co-recipient of the Levi L. Conant Prize from the American Mathematical Society.

Bailey is a member of the Church of Jesus Christ of Latter-day Saints. He has positioned himself as an advocate of the teaching of science and that accepting the conclusions of modern science is not incompatible with a religious view.

Selected works
 with Peter B. Borwein and Simon Plouffe: 
 with Michał Misiurewicz: 
 with Jonathan Borwein, Marcos Lopez de Prado and Qiji Jim Zhu: 
 with Jonathan Borwein: Mathematics by experiment: Plausible reasoning in the 21st century, A. K. Peters 2004, 2008 (with accompanying CD Experiments in Mathematics, 2006)
 with Jonathan Borwein, Neil Calkin, Roland Girgensohn, D. Russell Luke, Victor Moll: Experimental mathematics in action, A. K. Peters 2007
 with Jonathan Borwein, Roland Girgensohn: Experimentation in mathematics: Computational paths to discovery, A. K. Peters 2004
 with Robert F. Lucas, Samuel Williams (eds.): Performance tuning of scientific applications. Chapman & Hall/CRC Computational Science Series, CRC Press 2010, .

References

External links
Bailey's website
Experimental math website
Math Scholar blog
Mathematical Investor blog
Science Meets Religion website

20th-century American mathematicians
21st-century American mathematicians
Brigham Young University alumni
Stanford University School of Humanities and Sciences alumni
Living people
1948 births
Latter Day Saints from California